The 1942 Tennessee Volunteers (variously Tennessee, UT, or the Vols) represented the University of Tennessee in the 1942 college football season. Playing as a member of the Southeastern Conference (SEC), the team was led by head coach John Barnhill, in his second year, and played their home games at Shields–Watkins Field in Knoxville, Tennessee. They finished the season with a record of nine wins, one loss and one tie (9–1–1 overall, 4–1 in the SEC), and concluded the season with a victory against Tulsa in the 1943 Sugar Bowl.

Schedule

Team players drafted into the NFL

References

Tennessee
Tennessee Volunteers football seasons
Sugar Bowl champion seasons
Tennessee Volunteers football